Célestin Alfred Cogniaux (7 April 1841 – 15 April 1916) was a Belgian botanist. Amongst other plants, the genus Neocogniauxia of orchids is named after him.

In 1916 his enormous private herbarium was acquired by the National Botanic Garden of Belgium.

Publications 

 De Saldanha da Gama, J., Cogniaux, A. Bouquet de Mélastomacées brésiliennes dédiées a Sa Majesté Dom Pedro II empereur du Brésil.  A. Remacle, 1887 Verviers.
 Cogniaux, A., Melastomaceae. G. Masson, Paris, 1891
 Cogniaux, Alfredus, Orchidaceae.  Vol. III, part IV, V and VI  of Flora Brasiliensis. Lipsiae, Frid. Fleischer, 1893–1906
 Linden, L., Cogniaux, A. & Grignan, G., Les orchidées exotiques et leur culture en Europe. (Bruxelles; Paris. chez l'auteur. Octave Doin, 1894.
 Cogniaux, A., Goossens, A.: Dictionnaire Iconographique des Orchidees; 2 vol. 1896–1907. Perthes en Gâtinais (France), Institut des Jardins. 1990 
 Cogniaux, A., Harms, H. Cucurbitaceae-Cucurbiteae-Cucumerinae (2 vols.) W. Engelmann, Leipzig,1924.

References

Bibliography

External links 
 
 

1841 births
1916 deaths
19th-century Belgian botanists
20th-century Belgian botanists